Ali Shifau (born 19 May 1977) is a Maldivian film director, cinematographer and editor. One of the most successful filmmakers in Maldivian Cinema, Shifau is the recipient of a number of awards, including seven Gaumee Film Awards, and four Maldives Film Awards. In 2018, the Government of Maldives honoured him with the National Award of Recognition.

Career
Ali Shifau collaborated with Moomin Fuad to direct the critically appreciated crime film Heylaa (2006) featuring a cast of Ismail Rasheed, Ahmed Mauroof, Zeenath Abbas, Lufshan Shakeeb and Abdulla Muaz. The film narrates the story of a fourteen year old ambitious boy who finds himself unknowingly being involved in the smuggling of a revolver. Apart from directing the film, Shifau worked as the editor and cinematographer, marking it as the first Maldivian film to be shot in high-definition digital video. Though the film received positive reviews from critics, it was a commercial failure. Shifau opined that its commercial status was a result of casting "not very prominent" faces in the film and the "film-goers were not ready to accept the genre" at the time of its release. Ahmed Nadheem from Haveeru praised the narration and direction; "The film is embroiled in a realistic story which has sensible characters who are emotive under the helm of two great leaders serving as directors". At the 5th Gaumee Film Awards ceremony, Shifau won Best Cinematography and Best Art Direction award.

Three year later, the duo reunited for a suspense thriller Happy Birthday (2009) which narrates the story of a simple man who receives a call on his birthday informing him that his wife and son have been kidnapped, only to be returned for a ransom. The film was a commercial failure, despite the positive response from the critics. Winning five Gaumee Film Awards and twelve Maldives Film Awards, the film was also screened at the Venice Film Festival. The film earned him several accolades including his first Gaumee Film Award for Best Editing.

After being involved in two art films, Shifau paced his direction more into a commercial phase with family drama Dhin Veynuge Hithaamaigaa (2010) starring an ensemble cast including Yoosuf Shafeeu, Niuma Mohamed, Ali Seezan, Mohamed Manik and Ravee Farooq. The film showcases discrimination against the islanders, family revenge and fatherhood responsibilities. It received a positive response from critics while his direction and use of a "unique approach in presenting the concept to the romance-starved Maldivian audience" was particularly noted and was believed to be a "huge improvement" compared to the recent Maldivian films. Despite the commercial failure for his previous two films, Dhin Veynuge Hithaamaigaa was declared a commercial success. He then directed the psychological romantic thriller Zaharu (2011) starring Ali Seezan, Niuma Mohamed and Sheela Najeeb. The film centers on a married man who has a weekend affair with a woman who refuses to allow it to end and becomes obsessed with him. The film was inspired from Adrian Lyne-directed American psychological erotic thriller film Fatal Attraction (1987). Upon release it received a mixed response from critics and was declared a "flop" at the box office.

In 2013, Ali Shifau directed the horror film Fathis Handhuvaruge Feshun 3D which serves as a prequel to Fathis Handhuvaru (1997) starring Reeko Moosa Manik and Niuma Mohamed in lead roles. It was based on a story by Ibrahim Waheed, Jinaa: Fathis Handhuvaruge Feshun (2009), which itself is a prequel to the story Fathishandhuvaru (1996) written by himself which was later adapted to a film by the same name in 1997. The film was marketed as being the first 3D release for a Maldivian film and the first release derived from a spin-off. Upon release the film received generally negative reviews from critics. Ahmed Nadheem from Haveeru Daily criticized the screenplay for the lack of "amusement" and the "abrupt rush" in the story-line with "flaws in the script". He concluded the review by praising the efforts put into the visual effects and addressing the "dislike of the film in comparison to Fathis Handhuvaru". Fathimath Zaina from Vnews echoed similar sentiments and mentioned: "It brings a good opportunity for Maldivians to experience a Dhivehi film in 3D, however it is a disappointment as a film overall. It does not bring justice to the genre it represents and so does the same to the story it's based on". Despite the negative reviews, at the 7th Gaumee Film Awards he was nominated in the Best Director award category.

Shhifau's next release was the romantic film Emme Fahu Vindha Jehendhen (2015) starring Mohamed Jumayyil and Mariyam Majudha. The film was declared as the highest grossing Maldivian film  of the year, and was also a critical success. The collaboration was repeated with his next release, the romantic comedy Vaashey Mashaa Ekee (2016). His work was positively mentioned in the reviews, Ahmed Nadheem from Avas called it a "masterful creation by Shifau" and wrote: "Till this point, it was perceived that Shifau's talent was vanished with Heylaa, since all the films post his debut direction, his work is average at best". The film emerged as one of the highest-grossing films of the year. The film fetched him his first Gaumee Film Award for Best Director and Best Editor.

The following year, he released another romantic comedy film Mee Loaybakee (2017) starring Mohamed Jumayyil alongside Mariyam Azza. The film emerged as one of the highest grossing Maldivian films of 2017. This was followed by a family drama Vakin Loabin (2018), marking his fourth collaboration with Mohamed Jumayyil and his third collaboration with Mariyam Majudha. The film tells a story of a young couple's divorce and its impact on everyone involved. Upon release, the film met with a positive response from critics—specifically praising the screenplay for toning down its melodrama and breaking from the stereotypes of its genre—and was a commercial success. In a pre-premier review from Raajje.mv, Ismail Naail Nasheed favored the character development and minimised use of melodrama in the film while praising Shifau's direction.

Later during the year, first Maldivian anthology film was released which credited Shifau as the director of the segment titled Foshi which focuses on the impact on a couple's life due to the home use of an abortion drug. The project was filmed in 2013 and digitally released six years later due to several delays in post-production, where the producer of the film criticizes Farooq for "failing" to complete his segment during the stipulated time period took over the post-production.

Filmography

Feature film

Television and short films

Accolades

References

External links

Living people
People from Malé
1977 births
Maldivian film directors